James Lamb is the name of:

Sir James Lamb, 1st Baronet (1752–1824), British author, barrister and Member of Parliament
James Lamb (orientalist)
James Lamb (cabinetmaker) (1816–1903), British cabinetmaker and furniture designer